Leander is a surname. Notable people with the surname include:

 Anna Leander, Danish sociologist and political scientist
 Börje Leander (1918–2003), Swedish footballer
 Helena Leander (born 1982), Swedish politician
 Kathy Leander, Swiss singer
 Mike Leander (1941–1996), English arranger and record producer for Decca Records
 Richard Leander, pseudonym of Richard von Volkmann (1830–1889), German surgeon and poet
 Zarah Leander (1907–1981), Swedish actress

See also
 Leander (given name)